Dijana Mugoša (born 22 October 1995) is a Montenegrin handball player for SCM Craiova and the Montenegrin national handball team.

She represented Montenegro at the 2019 World Women's Handball Championship.

References

External links

Montenegrin female handball players
1995 births
Living people
Sportspeople from Podgorica
Olympic handball players of Montenegro
Handball players at the 2020 Summer Olympics
Expatriate handball players in Turkey
Montenegrin expatriate sportspeople in Croatia
Montenegrin expatriate sportspeople in Slovakia
Montenegrin expatriate sportspeople in Turkey
Ardeşen GSK players
RK Podravka Koprivnica players